The Sino-Japanese Journalist Exchange Agreement is a term that collectively refers to several agreements for a journalist exchange between China and Japan.

1964 Memorandum of Agreement 

Both sides signed the memorandum regarding trade on November 9, 1962. The members of both the Liao Chengzhi Office and the Tatsunosuke Takasaki Office held a meeting regarding journalism between China and Japan. The delegates for the meeting were Liao and Japanese Diet member Kenzo Matsumura.

On April 19, 1964, both countries reached a consensus for the establishment of a trade liaison office and the exchange of journalists.

Attendees of this meeting were:
For China - Liao Chengzhi, Sun Pinghua, Wang Xiaoyun.
For Japan - Kenzo Matsumura, Yutaro Takeyama, Kaheita Okazaki, Yoshimi Hurui, Tadaharu Okubo.

The memorandum of the meeting regarding journalist exchange was as follows:  

1. Based on the results of the meeting between Liao Chengzhi and Kenzo Matsumura, both China and Japan created the exchange of journalists.

2. Matters pertaining to the journalist exchange, including entry formalities, will be communicated and processed via the Liao Chengzhi Office and the Tatsunosuke Takasaki Office.

3. The number of journalists exchanged will be up to eight (8) persons from each country. Each newspaper company, press news agency, broadcasting network, and television network will provide one journalist. If necessary, depending on the situation, both parties can modify the number of journalists.

4. The first exchange of newspaper journalists will be achieved by the end of June 1964.

5. Both parties will send journalists at the same time.

6. The duration of the journalists' one time stay in the counterpart country will be up to a year.

7. Both parties will insure the safety of the other country's journalists.

8. Both parties will offer facilities for news gathering activities for the other country's journalists.

9. Journalists of both countries will abide by the administrative provisions for foreign journalists in the resident country, receiving fair treatment that each country gives foreign journalists.

10. Both parties will guarantee the freedom of communication of the other country's journalists.

11. If either country encounters any problem in the implementation of this agreement,  the Liao Chengzhi Office and the Tatsunosuke Takasaki Office will jointly resolve the problem.

12. The memorandum of this meeting will be made available in Chinese and in Japanese, and the documents will be equivalent in effect. The Liao Chengzhi Office and the Tatsunosuke Takasaki Office will keep copies of the memorandum in both languages on hand.

Appendix:
The five basic principles regarding friendship, on which Zhou Enlai and Kenzo Matsumura reached a consensus previously, will be ascertained in the Matsumura - Liao Chengzhi meeting and both countries will exchange journalists based on these principles. These are to honor each country's position and keep its rules, even though both countries are different in political doctrine.

1968 Amendment 

In the agreement, both countries state; 

"

"

"China pointed out that the impediment existing in the relationship between China and Japan, including between meeting members', resulted from American imperialism and their hostile policy toward China which Japan supported.

Japan stated Japan expresses deep understanding of China's position, but put aside such barrier from now, and facilitate more effort in normalizing relations between China and Japan.

China emphasized the desire to maintain Three politic principles and The Inseparable Principle of Politics and Economics in the relationship between China and Japan. Japan agreed. Both countries recognized the idea that The Inseparable Principle of Politics and Economics is that politics and economics are inseparable, relating to and facilitating each other, and the improvement in political relationship contributes to the development of the economical relationship."

On the same day, a meeting to amend the memorandum regarding Sino-Japanese Journalist Exchange Agreement was also arranged.

1 Both parties correspondingly confirmed that the mutual exchange of journalists on the basis of the memorandum regarding journalist exchange was that both countries follow the principle which is indicated in the Meeting Communique announced on March 6, 1968 and it will enhance the mutual understanding and friendship between Japan and China.

2  Both parties correspondingly agreed to amend the number of journalist exchanged, which is stipulated in the paragraph 3 of the memorandum regarding journalist exchange, from within eight persons from each country to within five persons from each country.

3 This arrangement will be the supplement and amendment for the memorandum regarding journalist exchange and have an equivalent effect.

4 This arrangement will be documented in Chinese and in Japanese, and the documents in both languages will be equivalent in effect. Japan-China Memorandum Trade Office (Japan) and Sino-Japanese Memorandum Trade Office (China) will keep the memorandum with one in Chinese and one in Japanese together.

March 6, 1968, Beijing

Three politic principles 

The Three politic principles appear in the Sino-Japanese Memorandum Trade Meeting Communique of 1968 are the long-held diplomatic principle which China have often asserted since Liao Chengzhi made a point as the government's official view on Zhou Enlai's behalf when Tadataka Sata, Japanese diet member, visited China on August 29, 1958.

According to Zhou Enlai's talk regarding trade between Japan and China in 1960, Three politic principles will be as follows.

1 Japanese government shall not take a hostile view toward China.
2 Japan shall not follow the United States and the conspiracy of creating two Chinas which the United States contrives. We definitely disagree with Japan's subservience.
3 The development of and the normalization of bilateral relations between China and Japan will not be interfered.

The compliance for these three points were discussed in the meeting for Memorandum Trade.

Press restraints

Joint Communique of Japan and the People's Republic of China was signed in Beijing on September 29, 1972. This established diplomatic relations and made substantial progress in the relationship between China and Japan. On January 5, 1974, China-Japan Trade Agreement (  or ) was signed in Beijing. On the same day, Memorandum Regarding Japan-China Continuous Journalist Exchange was also exchanged.

The Three political principles still exist. Each Japanese media organization, which sends correspondent to China, is required to agree with the contents of the statement in the documents regarding journalist exchange. This virtually means the journalists are banned from writing a press report that takes a hostile view toward China.

Deportation proceedings 

As world media has reported that, China restricts the information of foreign media, that the government assumes is illegal, and gives a deportation order for the journalists and the people who work for the foreign press, include Japanese journalists.

See also 
 Censorship in the People's Republic of China
 Freedom of the press

Footnotes

Sources
 (1945–2005) April 1, 2006  (Chinese)
日本外交主要文書・年表 第2巻  January, 1984  (Japanese)

Further reading

External links 
 Institute of Oriental Culture  Professor Akihiko Tanaka, University of Tokyo
 Three politic principles, August 27, 1960 (Chinese)

China–Japan relations
Freedom of expression law
Journalism in Asia
Treaties of the People's Republic of China
Treaties of Japan